Allobates melanolaemus is a species of frog in the family Aromobatidae. It is endemic to Peru where it is only known from near its type locality in the Loreto Province.
This little-known diurnal frog inhabits tropical moist lowland forest.

References

melanolaemus
Amphibians of Peru
Endemic fauna of Peru
Taxonomy articles created by Polbot
Amphibians described in 2001